Francesco Sonis (born 29 April 2002) is an Italian chess player who holds the title of Grandmaster (2021).

Biography
In 2013, Francesco Sonis won Italian Youth Chess Championship in the U12 age group.

He participated in European Youth Chess Championships and World Youth Chess Championships in the different age groups. Best result - in 2018, in Riga Francesco Sonis won European Youth Chess Championship in the O16 age group.

In 2017, he was awarded the FIDE International Master (IM) title.

In December 2020 he won the bronze medal at FIDE Online World Cadets & Youth Rapid Chess Championship in U18 Open category. He lost to Nihal Sarin in semifinal, but won against Mahdi Gholami Orimi in third place match at armageddon.

In May 2021 he won the Mitropa Cup with the Italian national team, in August he obtained the third norm of Grandmaster in Spilimbergo.

References

External links

Francesco Sonis chess games at 365chess.com

2002 births
Living people
People from Oristano
Italian chess players
Chess grandmasters
Sportspeople from Sardinia